The Millen Range is a prominent northwest–southeast trending mountain range, located west of the Cartographers Range in the Victory Mountains of Antarctica. Peaks in the range include Inferno, O'Donnell, Omega, Le Couteur, Head, Cirque, Gless, Turret and Crosscut, and Mount Aorangi. It was named by the New Zealand Federated Mountain Clubs Antarctic Expedition (NZFMCAE) of 1962–63, for John M. Millen, leader of the expedition.

References

Mountain ranges of Victoria Land
Borchgrevink Coast